Edward Ludwell (by 1523 – 1563/66), of Bath, Somerset, was an English politician and clothmaker.

He was a Member (MP) of the Parliament of England for Bath in October 1553, April 1554, 1558 and 1563. He was Mayor of Bath in 1550–1.

References

1560s deaths
Mayors of Bath, Somerset
English MPs 1553 (Mary I)
English MPs 1554
English MPs 1558
English MPs 1563–1567
Year of birth uncertain